The KUR EA class, later known as the EAR 28 class, was a class of  gauge  steam locomotives.  The six members of the class were built in 1928 for the Kenya-Uganda Railway (KUR) by Robert Stephenson and Company in Darlington, England, and were later operated by the KUR's successor, the East African Railways (EAR).

Class list
The builder's and fleet numbers, and initial names (later removed), of each member of the class were as follows:

See also

Rail transport in Kenya
Rail transport in Uganda

References

Notes

Bibliography

External links

East African Railways locomotives
Kenya-Uganda Railway locomotives
Metre gauge steam locomotives
Railway locomotives introduced in 1928
Robert Stephenson and Company locomotives
Steam locomotives of Kenya
Steam locomotives of Uganda
2-8-2 locomotives
Scrapped locomotives